Güldal Akşit (23 January 1960 – 3 December 2021) was a Turkish politician and the President of the Parliamentary Commission on Equal Opportunities for Men and Women.

Biography
Güldal Akşit was born in Malatya on 23 January 1960. Her father was a politician, Galip Demirel. She attended the Foreign Languages School of Hacettepe University. Then she graduated from Istanbul University's Faculty of Law.

She was elected as a member of the Grand National Assembly of Turkey, representing Istanbul, and served from 2002 to 2011. She was the minister of culture and tourism in the cabinet of Abdullah Gül and in the first cabinet of Recep Tayyip Erdogan. Akşit was the head of the AKP women's branch and interested in women's rights.

Akşit was married and had no children. She died from COVID-19 in Ankara on 3 December 2021, amid the COVID-19 pandemic in Turkey. She was 61. She is buried at Karşıyaka Cemetery in Ankara.

References

External links

1960 births
2021 deaths
21st-century Turkish women politicians
Women government ministers of Turkey
Justice and Development Party (Turkey) politicians
Istanbul University Faculty of Law alumni
Deputies of Istanbul
Members of the 23rd Parliament of Turkey
Members of the 22nd Parliament of Turkey
Ministers of Tourism of Turkey
Deaths from the COVID-19 pandemic in Turkey
Burials at Karşıyaka Cemetery, Ankara